Tweedsmuir may refer to:

In people
 Baron Tweedsmuir
 John Buchan, 1st Baron Tweedsmuir (1875–1940)
 John Norman Stuart Buchan, 2nd Baron Tweedsmuir (1911–1996)
 William de l'Aigle Buchan, 3rd Baron Tweedsmuir (1916–2008)
 John William de l'Aigle Buchan, 4th Baron Tweedsmuir (b. 1950--son of 3rd Baron)
 Priscilla Buchan, Baroness Tweedsmuir
 Susan Buchan, Baroness Tweedsmuir

In places
 Tweedsmuir, Scotland
 North Tweedsmuir Island, Nunavut, Canada
 South Tweedsmuir Island, Nunavut, Canada
 Tweedsmuir North Provincial Park and Protected Area, British Columbia, Canada
 Tweedsmuir South Provincial Park, British Columbia, Canada

In education
 Lord Tweedsmuir Elementary School, British Columbia, Canada
 Lord Tweedsmuir Secondary School, British Columbia, Canada
 Strathcona-Tweedsmuir School, Alberta, Canada